A Girl In Summer is a Portuguese film from 1986, directed by Vítor Gonçalves. It was considered by the Harvard Film Archive as One of the great Portuguese films of the 1980s, when screened as part of the School of Reis program.

Release and reception 
The film had its world premiere as part of the official selection of the Berlin Film Festival in 1986, and was part of the official selection of the International Film Festival Rotterdam.
In 2012, the film was part of the School of Reis film program, at the Harvard Film Archive, also screened at the Anthology Film Archives and the UCLA Film and Television Archive.

Cast 
 Isabel Galhardo as Isabel
 Diogo Dória as Diogo
 Joaquim Leitão as Quim
 José Manuel Mendes as José
 João Perry as The Hunter
 Virgílio Castelo as João
 Alexandra Guimarães as Joana
 Rui Reininho as a dancer

References

External links
 
 A Girl In Summer at MUBI
 A Girl In Summer at the Harvard Film Archive website
 A Girl In Summer at the Anthology Film Archives website
 A Girl In Summer at the Berkeley Art Museum and Pacific Film Archive website
 A Girl In Summer at Jonathan Rosenbaum's website
 A Girl In Summer at New York Mag website
 A Girl In Summer at Time Out New York website

1986 films
Portuguese drama films
1980s Portuguese-language films
Films set in Portugal
1986 directorial debut films